Andre Begemann and Martin Emmrich were the defending champions, but chose not to compete.
British team Ken Skupski and Neal Skupski outlasted the Italian team of Andrea Arnaboldi and Alessandro Giannessi to claim the title in three sets 6–4, 1–6, [10–7].

Seeds

Draw

Draw

References
 Main Draw

Pekao Szczecin Open - Doubles
2013 Doubles
2013 in Polish tennis